Queen Kamsiyochukwu Egbo (born June 29, 2000) is an American professional basketball player for the Indiana Fever of the Women's National Basketball Association (WNBA). She played college basketball at Baylor. She represented the United States at the 2019 FIBA Under-19 Women's Basketball World Cup and won a gold medal.

High school career
Egbo attended Travis High School in Richmond, Texas. During her freshman year in 2015, she averaged 14.2 points, and 13 rebounds per game and 150 total blocks. She also had two triple-doubles and 19 double-doubles during her first varsity season. During her sophomore year in 2016, she averaged 14.8 points, 11.3 rebounds, 2.3 steals and 4.6 blocks per game. 

During her junior year in 2017, she averaged 18.8 points, 13.1 rebounds, 4.1 blocks, and 2.1 steals per game. She also had 21 double-doubles in 33 regular season games for the Lady Tigers'. Following an outstanding season she was named district MVP. During her senior year, she averaged 17.3 points, 12.4 rebounds, 5.0 blocks and 3.9 steals per game. She was named a McDonald's All-American in 2018.

College career
During the 2018–19 season, in her freshman year, she averaged 5.4 points, 4.2 rebounds and 0.9 blocks in 35 games for Baylor. During the 2019–20 season, in her sophomore year, she averaged 10.8 points, 6.8 rebounds, 1.1 blocks and 0.9 steals per game in 30 games. Following the season, she was named the Big 12 Sixth Player of the Year.

During the 2020–21 season, in her junior year, she ranked tenth in the Big 12 in rebounds per game (7.2), fourth in offensive rebounds (3.1), and seventh in blocks per contest (1.2). She averaged 10.9 points in just 19.9 minutes per game and led the team in field goal percentage at a .504. She was named a top-five finalist for the Lisa Leslie Award. During the 2021–22 season, in her senior year, she averaged 11.0 points and 8.4 rebounds per game, and was named a top-ten finalist for the Lisa Leslie Award.

On March 27, 2022, Egbo renounced her extra year of eligibility due to the COVID-19 pandemic and declared for the 2022 WNBA draft.

Professional career
On April 11, 2022, Egbo was drafted in the first round, 10th overall, by the Indiana Fever in the 2022 WNBA draft.

WNBA career statistics

Regular season

|-
| align="left" | 2022
| align="left" | Indiana
| 33 || 31 || 21.8 || .442 || .000 || .645 || 6.3 || 0.9 || 0.9 || 1.2 || 1.9 || 7.2
|-
| align="left" | Career
| align="left" | 1 year, 1 team
| 33 || 31 || 21.8 || .442 || .000 || .645 || 6.3 || 0.9 || 0.9 || 1.2 || 1.9 || 7.2

National team career
Egbo was named to the 2018 United States women's national under-18 basketball team, however, she withdrew due to school commitments. Egbo represented the United States at the 2019 FIBA Under-19 Women's Basketball World Cup, where she averaged 7.9 points and 5.4 rebounds per game, and won a gold medal.

Career statistics

College

|-
| style="text-align:left;" | 2018–19
| style="text-align:left;" | Baylor
| 35 || 0 || 10.1 || .453 || .000 || .506 || 4.2 || 0.3 || 0.6 || 0.9 || 1.0 || 5.1
|-
| style="text-align:left;" | 2019–20
| style="text-align:left;" | Baylor
| 30 || 8 || 18.5 || .604 || .000 || .488 || 6.8 || 0.4 || 0.9 || 1.1 || 1.7 || 10.8 
|-
| style="text-align:left;" | 2020–21
| style="text-align:left;" | Baylor
| 30 || 30 || 24.9 || .500 || .000 || .639 || 8.6 || 0.9 || 1.2 || 1.9 || 2.5 || 11.1
|-
| style="text-align:left;" | 2021–22
| style="text-align:left;" | Baylor
| 35 || 35 || 23.9 || .498 || .000 || .702 || 8.4 || 0.9 || 0.9 || 1.8 || 1.9 || 11.0
|-
| style="text-align:center;" colspan=2 | Career
| 130 || 73 || 19.1 || .517	 || .000 || .594 || 7.0 || 0.6 || 0.9 || 1.4 || 1.8 || 9.5

References

2000 births
Living people
American women's basketball players
Basketball players from Texas
Baylor Bears women's basketball players
McDonald's High School All-Americans
Sportspeople from Houston
Indiana Fever draft picks
Indiana Fever players